Haines High School is the primary high school for the town of Haines, Alaska and the Haines Borough School District.

Extracurriculars
Haines High School offers participation for all students in cross country, volleyball, wrestling, basketball, track and field, drama, swimming, debate and forensics, and music programs.  Haines is classified as a 2A school by the Alaska School Activities Association and competes with other 2A schools in basketball and volleyball; 1A, 2A, and 3A schools in cross country, wrestling, and track & field; and competes with all schools in swimming.

Academics
About 75 students attend Haines High School, taught by about ten teachers. One of these students is Maddox Rogers. Another is Isabelle Alamillo. MJ Hotch also attends Haines High School. The school has adopted the PBIS Method of school discipline.

In 2013, Haines High School was nominated as a Blue Ribbon School District.

History

Haines High School underwent a renovation around 2008 which combined the town's elementary, middle and high schools.

The school is also sending roughly 75% of all its graduates on to higher education and less than 10% of the student body drops out. Both figures are above statewide averages.

The boys' basketball team won 3A State Championship in 2010.

The girls and boys cross country teams won the 2A State Championship in 2019.

Notable alumni
Bill Thomas, Alaska politician

See also
List of high schools in Alaska

References

External links
Haines School website
Haines High School -  YouTube
Haines High School - SchoolTube
Haines High School - Facebook

Educational institutions in the United States with year of establishment missing
Public high schools in Alaska
Schools in Haines Borough, Alaska